Hank Garrett (born Henry Greenberg Cohen Sandler Weinblatt, October 26, 1931) is an American actor, comedian, author, speaker, teacher, mixed martial artist and retired professional wrestler best known for the television role of Officer Nicholson on Car 54, Where Are You?

Early life and career 
Garrett was born in Harlem, New York City, to Sam and Ida Greenberg, both Jewish Russian immigrants. His birth certificate lists his name as Henry Greenberg Cohen Sandler Weinblatt. Garrett began powerlifting, bodybuilding and karate as a means of self-protection in a rough neighborhood, starting at age 13.

He was the 1958 winner of the Junior Olympic Powerlifting competition. This led to an extended stint (1957-1966) in professional wrestling under the name of The Minnesota Farm Boy. In one of his last matches he fought a young Jimmy Snuka, he mentioned this during his hall of fame speech with Jimmy Snuka in attendance. In June 2009 he was inducted into the Professional Wrestling Hall of Fame.

His mother was worried that he was on a path toward delinquency and had Willie Bryant and Sammy Davis Jr. talk to him, and they got him a job as a "band boy". He would set up the music stands for a band at shows, he was paid $50 for his first day of work. He later worked at the club owned by Larry Storch.

After several years in pro wrestling, Garrett turned to comedy and performed a regular routine in the Borscht Belt, using anecdotes from his childhood years in Harlem.

Television career 
As well as his regular role on Car 54, Where are You?, Garrett has acted in a number of television productions including episodes of The Dukes of Hazzard, Knots Landing, Max Headroom, Santa Barbara, Three's Company, Airwolf, Knight Rider, Columbo, Dragnet, Kojak, and Alien Nation. Garrett is also known for his voiceover work on Garfield and GI Joe.

Film career 
Among Garrett's film credits are notable roles in Serpico, Three Days of the Condor, Death Wish, and The Sentinel. Garrett tends to be cast as the "heavy" in many roles,

He played a hitman dressed as a postman in Three Days of the Condor. During the filming a tell was needed so that the Redford character would know that Garrett was not a real postman and Redford thought of the idea to have Garrett wear Redford's shoes in the scene, that would raise suspicion. During the filming of the fight scene, Garrett broke Redford's nose. Garrett won the New York Film Critics’ Award for that role.

Garrett has co-starred with television and film notables including Peter Falk, Patrick Stewart, Kathleen Turner, Christopher Lloyd, Al Pacino, Sophia Loren, James Coburn, Robert Redford, Faye Dunaway and James Earl Jones.

Personal life 
Garrett has been married three times. His first wife was Agnes Deangelis (1963-1979), second Linda DeBlasio (1982-2008) and third Deanna Marie Smith (July 23, 2017). Hank has two sons with whom he no longer has contact with.
In 2014, Garrett is active in philanthropic causes, and is on the Screen Actors Guild board. He lives in the San Fernando valley and is working on production of a one-man show.

Selected filmography 

The Producers (1967) - Stagehand (uncredited)
A Lovely Way to Die (1968) - Henderson (uncredited)
Richard (1972) - Advisor
Serpico (1973) - Malone
Death Wish (1974) - Andrew McCabe
Three Days of the Condor (1975) - Mailman
Deadly Hero (1975) - Buckley
The Sentinel (1977) - James Brenner
Exorcist II: The Heretic (1977) - Conductor
Firepower (1979) - Oscar Bailey
The Amityville Horror (1979) - Bartender
The Jazz Singer (1980) - Police Sergeant
The Sting II (1983) - Cab Driver
The Rosebud Beach Hotel (1984) - Kramer
Johnny Dangerously (1984) - Mayor
The Boys Next Door (1985) - Detective Ed Hanley
Bad Guys (1986) - Bud Schultz
Blood Frenzy (1987) - Dave Ash
That's Adequate (1989) - Space Pilot
Maniac Cop 2 (1990) - Tom O'Henton
Steel and Lace (1991) - Capt. Grover
Final Approach (1991) - RSO
Guns and Lipstick (1995) - Foreman
Fatal Choice (1995) - Lt. Hadcock
Exit in Red (1996) - Dr. Wayland
Nothing to Lose (1997) - Manny - the bartender
Safe House (1998) - Hitman / Postman
The Modern Adventures of Tom Sawyer (1998) - Police Chief
Baby Geniuses (1999) - Guard
The Million Dollar Kid (2000) - Delivery Dispatcher
Moses: Fallen. In the City of Angels. (2005) - Lucky Palermo

References

External links 
Official website

1931 births
20th-century American comedians
20th-century professional wrestlers
Living people
American male professional wrestlers
American male television actors
American male film actors
American male voice actors
American male comedians
People from Harlem
Professional Wrestling Hall of Fame and Museum
Professional wrestlers from New York (state)
Professional wrestlers from New York City